Rio Grande Station is the name of several railroad stations including:

Rio Grande Station (Rio Grande, New Jersey) now located in Lower Township, New Jersey
Rio Grande Station (Salt Lake City) also known as Denver and Rio Grande Railroad Station
Rio Grande Station (Grand Junction) also known as Denver and Rio Grande Western Railroad Depot
Rio Grande Station (Texas)
Rio Grande Station (El Paso Electric) also known as Rio Grande Power Station
Rio Grande station (Chacra, Colorado)